is a railway station on the Seibu Shinjuku Line in Nerima, Tokyo, Japan, operated by the private railway operator Seibu Railway.

Lines

Station layout

The station has two island platforms serving four tracks.

Platforms

History
Kami-Shakujii Station opened on 16 April 1927. Station numbering was introduced on all Seibu Railway lines during fiscal 2012, with Kami-Shakujii Station becoming "SS13".

Passenger statistics
In fiscal 2013, the station was the 21st busiest on the Seibu network with an average of 43,643 passengers daily. The passenger figures for previous years are as shown below.

References

External links

 Kami-Shakujii Station information (Seibu) 

Railway stations in Tokyo
Railway stations in Japan opened in 1927